VJC may refer to:

 Victoria Junior College, a co-educational junior college in Singapore
 Vidarbha Janata Congress, a political party in the Indian state of Maharashtra
 VJC, the ICAO code for VietJet Air, a Vietnamese airline company